William de Warenne (9 February 1256 – 15 December 1286) was the only son of John de Warenne, 6th Earl of Surrey and his wife Alice de Lusignan.

Life
William married Joan, daughter of Robert de Vere, 5th Earl of Oxford. They had the following children:
John de Warenne, 7th Earl of Surrey (June 1286 – June 1347)
Alice de Warenne (15 June 1287 - 23 May 1338), wife of Edmund FitzAlan, 2nd Earl of Arundel.

William was killed in a tournament at Croydon in 1286, predeceasing his father. It has been suggested that this was murder, planned in advance by William's enemies. On the 6th Earl's death the title went to John, the only son of William. John died without legitimate children, so on his death the title passed to Richard FitzAlan, 10th Earl of Arundel, eldest son of Edmund FitzAlan and John's sister Alice.

Ancestry

External links
 Inquisition Post Mortem, dated 1286.

References

1256 births
1286 deaths
13th-century English people
De Warenne family
Heirs apparent who never acceded